Pyaar Ke Papad ( Love's papadum) is an Indian Rom-com television series produced by Panorama Entertainment, aired on Star Bharat. It premiered on 18 February 2019 and ended on 10 August 2019.

Plot
Omkar Gupta and his colleague Shivika Mishra fall in love and want to get married. However, Shivika's casteist father Trilokinath does not approve of the union because of the caste differences between his daughter and Omkar, and sets before Omkar many challenges to test that he is worthy of Shivika's hand in marriage.

Cast

Main
 Swarda Thigale as Shivika Gupta (néé Mishra), love interest of Omkar Gupta
 Aashay Mishra as Omkar Gupta, love interest of Shivika Mishra. Works as a bank manager at Kanpur cooperative bank.
 Akhilendra Mishra as Trilokinath Mishra, Shivika Mishra's father, Omkar Gupta's father in law.
 Anshul Trivedi as Alankar, Antagonist, Fiance of Shivika Mishra arranged by her father, Trilokinath Mishra.

Recurring

 Ekta Methai as Shivika's younger sister;Trilokinath daughter.
Tina Bhatia as Jaya, Jagat's wife
 Jinal Jain as Dolly; Shivika's friend.
 Priyanka Shukla
 Anaya Shivan
 Nelakshi Singh Bhardwaj
 Prerna Gautam
 Azad Ansari as Mangal Gupta;Omkar's brother.
 Pratish Vohra as Nandu Gupta;Omkar's elder brother
 Sonu Pathak as GST;Omkar's friend.
Chandrahas Pandey as Puttu
 Akshita Arora as Vidhyavati, GST Mother

Production
Some of the initial sequences were filmed at Kanpur.

References

2019 Indian television series debuts
Hindi language television sitcoms
Star Bharat original programming